Cairnhill Single Member Constituency (SMC) was a former single member constituency in Singapore. It used to exist from 1955 to 1988 as Cairnhill Constituency and was renamed as Cairnhill Single Member Constituency (SMC) as part of Singapore's political reforms. The SMC was merged into Kampong Glam Group Representation Constituency (GRC) in 1991. 

Lim Kim San was the elected Member of Parliament from 1959 to 1980 and then Wong Kwei Cheong from 1980 to 1991.

History 
The constituency was formed during the 1955 Singaporean general election, encompassing Balestier, Rochore and Tanglin wards. 

During the 1959 Singaporean general election, part of the constituency was split to form River Valley Constituency.

In 1988, the constituency was renamed Cairnhill Single Member Constituency as part of Singapore's political reforms and also absorbed River Valley Constituency back.

In 1991, the constituency was abolished and merged into Kampong Glam GRC.

Member of Parliament

Electoral results

Elections in the 1950s

Elections in the 1960s

Elections in the 1970s

Elections in the 1980s

Historical maps

References 

Singaporean electoral divisions
Orchard Road